Jonathan Fabian Mendoza Valenzuela (born January 26, 1990) is a Colombian footballer who currently plays for the Rome Gladiators in the National Indoor Soccer League.

Career

College and amateur
Mendoza was born in Colombia, but moved to Altamonte Springs, graduating from Lyman High School in 2009. During his senior year in high school, he was second-team All-American, and first-team All-Central Florida, according to ESPN RISE.

He accepted a scholarship offer from Stetson in DeLand, Florida, where he started most of his career. He totaled 18 goals and 22 assists in 68 matches (57 starts). He was the 2011 Atlantic Sun Conference Player of the Year in men's soccer after scoring 11 goals that season.

In addition to Stetson, he played with Orlando City U-23 (and Central Florida Kraze before that) in the USL Premier Development League. He led the U-23 Lions to the Southeast Division and Southern Conference titles in 2012.

Professional
Mendoza made himself available for the 2013 MLS SuperDraft, but went undrafted. He was signed to Orlando City Soccer Club on March 1, 2013.

After the 2013 season, he was released by Orlando City and signed with the Rochester Rhinos, thereby staying in the USL Pro.

References

 NISL profile

1990 births
Living people
Colombian footballers
Colombian expatriate footballers
Stetson Hatters men's soccer players
Orlando City U-23 players
Orlando City SC (2010–2014) players
Rochester New York FC players
Orlando City B players
USL League Two players
USL Championship players
Colombian emigrants to the United States
Expatriate soccer players in the United States
American sportspeople of Colombian descent
Association football midfielders
Major Arena Soccer League players
Penn FC players
Orlando SeaWolves players
Soccer players from Orlando, Florida
Footballers from Bogotá